The Federal Polytechnic Idah, formerly Idah College of Technology, is a federal government-owned tertiary education institution established in 1977 in Idah, Kogi State. It is approved by the National Board for Technical Education and it also offers National Diploma and Higher National Diploma courses at undergraduate levels with the aim of “training competitive manpower for development”.

Schools
 School of Business Studies
 School of Engineering
 School of Environmental Studies
 School of Technology

Available Courses 
The available list of courses offered by Federal Polytechnic Idah include:
 ACCOUNTANCY
 ARCHITECTURAL TECHNOLOGY
 BUILDING TECHNOLOGY
 BUSINESS ADMINISTRATION & MANAGEMENT
 CIVIL ENGINEERING TECHNOLOGY
 COMPUTER SCIENCE
 ELECTRICAL/ELECTRONIC ENGINEERING TECHNOLOGY
 ESTATE MANAGEMENT AND VALUATION
 FOOD TECHNOLOGY
 FOUNDRY ENGINEERING TECHNOLOGY
 HOSPITALITY MANAGEMENT
 LEISURE AND TOURISM MANAGEMENT
 LIBRARY AND INFORMATION SCIENCE
 MARKETING
 MECHANICAL ENGINEERING TECHNOLOGY
 METALLURGICAL ENGINEERING TECHNOLOGY
 OFFICE TECHNOLOGY AND MANAGEMENT
 PUBLIC ADMINISTRATION
 QUANTITY SURVEYING
 SCIENCE LABORATORY TECHNOLOGY
 STATISTICS
 SURVEYING AND GEO-INFORMATICS
 URBAN AND REGIONAL PLANNING

See also
 List of polytechnics in Nigeria

References

External links

Federal polytechnics in Nigeria
Kogi State
1977 establishments in Nigeria
Educational institutions established in 1977